HMS Revenge was one of seven Royal Sovereign-class pre-dreadnought battleships built for the Royal Navy during the 1890s. She spent much of her early career as a flagship for the Flying Squadron and in the Mediterranean, Home and Channel Fleets. Revenge was assigned to the International Squadron blockading Crete during the 1897–1898 revolt there against the Ottoman Empire. She was placed in reserve upon her return home in 1900, and was then briefly assigned as a coast guard ship before she joined the Home Fleet in 1902. The ship became a gunnery training ship in 1906 until she was paid off in 1913.

Revenge was recommissioned the following year, after the start of World War I, to bombard the coast of Flanders as part of the Dover Patrol, during which she was hit four times, but was not seriously damaged. She had anti-torpedo bulges fitted in early 1915, the first ship to be fitted with them operationally. The ship was renamed Redoubtable later that year and was refitted as an accommodation ship by the end of the year. The last surviving member of her class, the ship was sold for scrap in November 1919.

Design and description
The design of the Royal Sovereign-class ships was derived from that of the  battleships, greatly enlarged to improve seakeeping and to provide space for a secondary armament as in the preceding  battleships. As a flagship, Revenges crew consisted of 695 officers and ratings in 1903.

The Royal Sovereigns were powered by a pair of three-cylinder, vertical triple-expansion steam engines, each driving one shaft.

Their main armament consisted of four breech-loading (BL)  guns mounted in two twin-gun barbettes, one each fore and aft of the superstructure. Each gun was provided with 80 rounds. Their secondary armament consisted of ten quick-firing (QF)  guns. 200 rounds per gun were carried by the ships. Sixteen QF 6-pounder guns of an unknown type and a dozen QF 3-pounder Hotchkiss guns were fitted for defence against torpedo boats. The two 3-pounders in the upper fighting top were removed in 1903–1904, and all of the remaining light guns from the lower fighting tops and main deck followed in 1905–1909. The Royal Sovereign-class ships mounted seven 14-inch (356 mm) torpedo tubes, although Revenge had four of hers removed in 1902.

The Royal Sovereigns' armour scheme was similar to that of the Trafalgars, as the waterline belt of compound armour only protected the area between the barbettes. Above the belt was a strake of  nickel-steel armour closed off by  transverse bulkheads.

Construction

Revenge was the ninth ship of her name to serve in the Royal Navy and was ordered under the Naval Defence Act Programme of 1889. The ship was laid down by Palmers Shipbuilding and Iron Company at their shipyard in Jarrow in Tyne and Wear, England, on 12 February 1891. She was floated out of the drydock on 3 November 1892, and completed on 22 March 1894 at a cost of £954,825.

Operational history

1892-1896
Upon completion, Revenge was placed in reserve at Portsmouth. Almost two years later, she mobilised there on 14 January 1896 as flagship of the Particular Service Squadron, soon renamed the Flying Squadron, which was formed in response to rising tensions in Europe following the Jameson Raid and Germany's Kaiser Wilhelm II's telegram of support to the Boer government. The squadron was briefly attached to the Mediterranean Fleet in the middle of the year. When it was disbanded on 5 November, Revenge relieved the battleship  as the flagship of the second-in-command of the Mediterranean Fleet.

International Squadron
From February 1897 to December 1898, Revenge served in the International Squadron, a multinational force made up of ships of the Austro-Hungarian Navy, French Navy, Imperial German Navy, Italian Royal Navy (Regia Marina), Imperial Russian Navy, and Royal Navy that intervened in the 1897-1898 Greek uprising on Crete against rule by the Ottoman Empire. She served as flagship of the British component of the squadron, initially under Rear-Admiral Robert Harris, and later under Rear-Admiral Gerard Noel, and played a very active role in the International Squadron's operations. Leading a Royal Navy force that reinforced the battleship , the British ship on station at Crete when unrest broke out in early February 1897, Revenge and the battleship  arrived at Canea (now Chania) on 9 February 1897. She contributed personnel to an international landing force of sailors and marines the squadron put ashore at Canea on 15 February 1897. After a bombardment by the British battleship  on 26 and 27 March 1897 forced insurgents to abandon their siege of the Izzeddin Fortress  near the entrance to Suda Bay, Revenge put a contingent of Royal Marines ashore that occupied the fortress.

Thanks to the International Squadron's actions, organized fighting on Crete ended in late March 1897, although the insurrection continued. The squadron focused on supporting international occupation forces ashore and enforcing a blockade of Crete and key ports in Greece. After Rear Admiral Noel relieved Rear Admiral Harris on 12 January 1898, Noel withdrew his flag from Crete, and Revenge conducted operations elsewhere. However, a violent riot by Cretan Turks in Candia (now Heraklion) on 6 September 1898, prompted reinforcement of the international forces on Crete, and Revenge arrived with Rear-Admiral Noel aboard on 12 September 1898. In a meeting aboard Revenge on the morning of 13 September 1898, Noel ordered the Ottoman governor, Edhem Pasha, to take a number of actions to ensure that no further violence would take place and deliver the ringleaders of the riot to the British to face trial; when Edhem Pasha expressed reluctance, Revenge and Camperdown conducted a demonstration that convinced him to comply. The riot led the International Squadron to demand the withdrawal of all Ottoman forces from Crete, and when the final Ottoman troops finally departed on 6 November 1898, sailors from Revenge and the British battleship  supervised their embarkation aboard the British torpedo gunboat . On 19 December 1898, Revenge, with Noel aboard, joined the Italian battleship Francesco Morosini (carrying the admiral commanding the International Squadron's Italian ships) and the Russian armored cruiser Gerzog Edinburgski (with the senior Russian commander, Rear Admiral Nikolai Skrydlov, aboard) in steaming to Milos with the French protected cruiser Bugeaud, flagship of the International Squadron's overall commander, Rear Admiral Édouard Pottier. At Milos, they rendezvoused with Prince George of Greece and Denmark aboard his yacht. After Prince George boarded Bugeaud on 20 December, Revenge, Francesco Morosini, and Gerzog Edinburgski escorted Bugeaud to Crete, where Prince George disembarked on 21 December 1898 to take office as the High Commissioner of an autonomous Cretan State under the suzerainty of the Ottoman Empire, bringing the Cretan uprising to an end. The International Squadron then dissolved.

1899-1913
In 1899, Revenge suffered a cordite explosion in one of her 6-inch (152-mm) magazines due to spontaneous combustion, but the damage was not very severe because only three cartridges detonated. In April 1900, the battleship  replaced her in the Mediterranean and she returned home, paying off into Fleet Reserve at Chatham Dockyard. During this time the ship had a wireless telegraph installed. On 18 April 1901, Revenge was recommissioned at Chatham by Captain Frederic Fisher to relieve Alexandra as both the coast guard ship at Portland and the flagship of Rear Admiral Sir Gerard Noel, Admiral Superintendent of Naval Reserves. In March 1902, she arrived at Portsmouth for a refit that included the provision of casemates for her upper-deck six-inch guns, and her crew was temporarily transferred to the elderly ironclad , which also took on her duties at Portland. Captain Fisher and his crew were back on board Revenge in early June 1902, following gun trials after the repairs. After the refit, she took part in the fleet review held at Spithead on 16 August 1902 for the coronation of King Edward VII, then commissioned in October 1902 to serve as flagship of the Home Fleet upon its creation.

In April 1904, Revenge and her sister ship  both struck a submerged wreck off the Scilly Isles while serving with the Home Fleet, damaging their bottoms. In July 1905, the ship participated in maneuvers with the Reserve Fleet and was then transferred to the Portsmouth Reserve Division on 1 September 1905. In June 1906, she relieved the battleship Colossus as the gunnery training ship at Portsmouth and was assigned to the gunnery school HMS Excellent. On 13 June 1908, Revenge was struck by the merchant ship  when the latter was cut loose by her tugboat during a sudden squall in Portsmouth Harbour. In October 1909, she conducted gunnery tests on the obsolete battleship  to evaluate the effects of shells against varying thicknesses of armour. On 7 January 1912, the ship was badly damaged when, during a gale at Portsmouth, she broke loose from her moorings and drifted onto the bow of the dreadnought . Later that year, her guns were relined down to 10 inches (254 mm) for testing; the liners were removed in October 1912. Revenge was relieved as a gunnery training ship by the battleship  and paid off on 15 May 1913. She was laid up at Motherbank, awaiting disposal.

World War I
Revenge was given a reprieve from the scrapyard by the outbreak of World War I in August 1914. The Admiralty decided to bring her back into service for use in coastal bombardment duties off the coast of Flanders. In September and October 1914, she was refitted at Portsmouth for this mission, which included relining her 13.5-inch guns down to 12 inches (305 mm), improving their range by about 1,000 yards (914 meters). Her refit completed, she was ordered on 31 October 1914 to stand by to relieve the battleship  as flagship of the Dover Patrol. Plans for the squadron to participate in an attack on German submarine bases were cancelled due to bad weather on 14 November 1914, and instead Revenge and the battleship  departed Dover, England, for Dunkirk, France.

Revenge participated in her first action of the war when she joined the gunboat , six British and four French destroyers, and a French torpedo boat in bombarding German troops from off Nieuwpoort, Belgium, on 22 November 1914. On 15–16 December 1914, Revenge bombarded German heavy artillery batteries, during which time she received two 8-inch (203-mm) shell hits, one of which penetrated her hull below the waterline and caused her to be withdrawn for repairs. In early 1915, the ship participated in experiments using aircraft to observe and control her gunfire, but these were only partially successful. In April and May 1915 she underwent a refit at Chatham Dockyard in which she had anti-torpedo bulges fitted. Afterwards, Revenge conducted trials using sea-based observers on off-shore platforms to direct the bombardment. On 2 August 1915, she was renamed Redoubtable to free the name Revenge for a new dreadnought battleship.

One of her anti-torpedo bulges was deliberately flooded to give her a list that would increase the range of her guns. The ship was hit by a pair of 6-inch shells during the action. Redoubtable underwent another refit from October to December 1915. Afterwards, she was not recommissioned, instead serving as an accommodation ship at Portsmouth until February 1919.

Disposal
Redoubtable was sold to Thos. W. Ward for scrapping for £42,750 on 6 November 1919. She was subsequently broken up at Swansea and Briton Ferry.

Notes

References
 
 
 
 
 
 
 
 Clowes, Sir William Laird. The Royal Navy: A History From the Earliest Times to the Death of Queen Victoria, Volume Seven. London: Chatham Publishing, 1997. .  
 
 
 McTiernan, Mick, A Very Bad Place Indeed For a Soldier. The British involvement in the early stages of the European Intervention in Crete. 1897 - 1898, King's College, London, September 2014.

External sources

 The Dreadnought Project has a list of commanders

 

Royal Sovereign-class battleships
Ships built on the River Tyne
1892 ships
Victorian-era battleships of the United Kingdom
World War I battleships of the United Kingdom